This is a list of vocational schools in the United States. Vocational schools in the United States are traditionally two-year colleges which prepare students to enter the workforce after they receive an Associate degree. Other options include using courses as credit transferable to four-year universities. Programs often combine classroom lessons in theory with hands-on applications of the lessons students learned.

Alabama 
Brown Mackie College
Culinard
Remington College

Arizona
The Art Institute of Phoenix
Brown Mackie College
Maricopa Skill Center

Arkansas
Pulaski Technical College
Remington College

California 
The Art Institute of California – Orange County
Platt College (San Diego)
UEI College

Colorado 
The Art Institute of Colorado
Colorado Technical University
Everest College

Connecticut 
Lincoln College of New England
Porter and Chester Institute

Florida 
The Art Institute of Tampa
Culinard
Brown Mackie College
Amslee Institute

Georgia 
Art Institute of Atlanta
Brown Mackie College
Miller-Motte Technical College
UEI College

Idaho
Brown Mackie College
College of Western Idaho
Eastern Idaho Technical College

Illinois 
The Art Institute of Chicago
Coyne College
Midwest Technical Institute
Rasmussen College
Vatterott College

Indiana 
Brown Mackie College
ITT Technical Institute
Midwest Technical Institute

Iowa 
Brown Mackie College
Vatterott College

Kansas 
Brown Mackie College
Pinnacle Career Institute
Rasmussen College
Vatterott College
WSU Tech

Kentucky 
Brown Mackie College
Kentucky Community and Technical College System
Spencerian College

Louisiana 
Culinard
Louisiana Technical College
Northwest Louisiana Technical College
Remington College

Maine
Argosy University
Empire Beauty Schools

Maryland 
Empire Beauty Schools
ITT Technical Institute

Massachusetts 
National Aviation Academy
Porter and Chester Institute
Universal Technical Institute

Michigan
Art Institute of Michigan
ITT Technical Institute
Northwestern Technological Institute

Minnesota 
Penn Foster Career School
Stratford Career Institute

Mississippi 
Delta Technical College
ITT Technical Institute

Missouri 
Brown Mackie College
Midwest Technical Institute
Pinnacle Career Institute
Vatterott College

Montana
ITT Technical Institute
Montana Tech of the University of Montana
Stratford Career Institute

Nebraska 
ITT Technical Institute
Stratford Career Institute

Nevada 
The Art Institute of Las Vegas
Everest College
ITT Technical Institute

New Hampshire 
Lakes Region Community College
NHTI

New Jersey 
Divers Academy International
E & S Academy
Empire Beauty Schools
ITT Technical Institute
Lincoln Group of Schools

New Mexico
Brown Mackie College
ITT Technical Institute

New York 
Empire Beauty Schools
ITT Technical Institute
Onondaga School of Therapeutic Massage

North Carolina 
The Art Institute of Charlotte
Culinard
Empire Beauty Schools
Wake Technical Community College

North Dakota
ITT Technical Institute
Stratford Career Institute

Ohio 
Brown Mackie College
Ohio Technical College
Vatterott College

Oklahoma
Brown Mackie College
ITT Technical Institute
Vatterott College

Oregon
Pioneer Pacific College
The Art Institute of Portland

Pennsylvania
The Art Institute of Philadelphia
Lincoln Group of Schools
McCann School of Business & Technology

Rhode Island 
New England Institute of Technology

South Carolina 
The Art Institute of Charleston
Brown Mackie College
Culinard

South Dakota
Mitchell Technical Institute
Western Dakota Technical Institute

Tennessee 
Tennessee Colleges of Applied Technology
Vatterott College

Texas 
Brown Mackie College
Everest College
UEI College

Utah 
 Bridgerland Technical College
 Davis Technical College
 Dixie Technical College
 Mountainland Technical College
 Ogden–Weber Technical College
 Southwest Technical College
 Tooele Technical College
 Uintah Basin Technical College

Vermont 
Vermont Technical College

Virginia 
Culinard
Everest College
Liberty University, in connection with Virginia Technical Institute.

Washington
American Northwest College, an exempt institution by the Washington Workforce Training and Education Coordinating Board 
Bates Technical College
Bellingham Technical College
Clover Park Technical College
Lake Washington Institute of Technology
Renton Technical College
Spokane Community College
The Art Institute of Seattle
Carrington College (US)
Everest College

Wisconsin 
Wisconsin Technical College System

Wyoming 
Casper College

See also
 Higher education in the United States

References

Vocational
 United States
College